The Marriage of Gustav III is a Swedish television series in two parts built upon a period in the life of King Gustav III of Sweden. The series aired in 2001. The director was Marcus Olsson and the manuscript writer was Klas Östergren.

Plot
The series take place at the royal Swedish court in the 1770s on the Royal Palace, Stockholm, and Ekolsund Castle. The plot portrays the famous event in 1775 when the King, after nine years of marriage, decides to consummate his marriage with the Queen in order to provide an heir to the throne. The reconciliation between the royal couple is managed by Stable master Adolf Fredrik Munck af Fulkila and, though the event is followed by success in 1778, it resulted in a scandal where the legitimacy of the Crown Prince is questioned by the mother of the King.

Reception
The series won the prize of best Television series, the Prix Europa, in 2002.

Cast
Jonas Karlsson - Konung Gustav III
Iben Hjejle - Queen Sophia Magdalena of Denmark
Stefan Gödicke - Duke Charles
Harald Lönnbro - Prince Frederick Adolf of Sweden
Evabritt Strandberg - Dowager Queen Louisa Ulrika of Prussia
Rebecka Englund - Mamsell Anna Sofia Ramström
Magnus Roosmann - Stable master Adolf Fredrik Munck af Fulkila
Tomas Bolme - Riksråd Ulrik Scheffer
Hans Wigren - Elis Schröderheim
Brasse Brännström - Royal Medicus Bäck
Malin Lundgren - Princess Sophie Albertine of Sweden
Sanna Mari Patjas - Maria Aurora Uggla
Björn Wahlberg - Gustaf Mauritz Armfelt

References

External links

Fiction set in the 1770s
Swedish television miniseries
2001 Swedish television series debuts
Cultural depictions of Gustav III
2001 Swedish television series endings
Television shows set in Sweden
Television series set in the 1770s
Television series about marriage
2000s television miniseries
Television series set in the 1780s